The siege of Pirna (or Investment of Pirna) took place in 1756 as part of the Prussian invasion of Saxony during the Third Silesian War (part of the Seven Years' War).

Following the occupation of the capital Dresden by Frederick the Great on 9 September the Saxon army had withdrawn south and taken up position at the fortress of Pirna under Frederick von Rutowski. The Saxons hoped to receive relief from the Austrian army which was across the border in neighbouring Bohemia under Marshal Browne.

Following the Battle of Lobositz the Austrians withdrew, and tried to approach Pirna by a different route but they failed to make contact with the defenders. Despite a Saxon attempt to escape by crossing the River Elbe, it soon became apparent that their position was hopeless. On 14 October Rutowski concluded a capitulation with Frederick.

In total 18,000 troops surrendered. They were swiftly and forcibly incorporated into the Prussian forces, an act which caused widespread protest even from Prussians. Many of them later deserted and fought with the Austrians against the Prussian forces - with whole regiments changing sides at the Battle of Prague.

References

Bibliography

 Dull, Jonathan R. The French Navy and the Seven Years' War. University of Nebraska Press, 2005.
 Jacques, Tony. Dictionary of Battles and Sieges. Greenwood Press, 2007.
 Szabo, Franz A.J. The Seven Years War in Europe, 1756-1763. Pearson, 2008.

Pirna
Siege of Pirna
Pirna
Pirna
1756 in the Holy Roman Empire
18th century in Saxony
Pirna
Pirna
Pirna